Heffron may refer to:

 Heffron (surname)
 Electoral district of Heffron
 Heffron, Wisconsin
 Heffron Hall (St. Mary's University)
 USAT Heffron